Uatlok Twithu also known as Borokathal , is a small town located in the interior of Sadar sub-division of West Tripura district of Tripura, India. The Sumli river flows through the town. The locality consist of the ethnic Tripuri people. The town has the only high secondary school of the area.

The Location
Uatlok Twithu is in the TTAADC. It is located in Sadar subdivision of West Tripura district in Tripura state of India. It is a strategic location in northern Sadar subdivision because of its existence as the starting point for journey to the interior Boromura hills.

The town is situated over the plains besides the river Sumli that originates from Damra Hills in Boromura hill range. It has connectivity of road with important interior villages of Kisong, Boiragi, Hezamara.

Barkathal Baptist Church
The local church of Uatlok Twithu is one of the oldest in the Sumli Valley area. It has been the mother church of more than 9 other churches like Khwichang Baptist Church, Boiragi Baptist Church, Tokmakari Baptist Church, Yachakrai Baptist Church and more.

Education 
Tipprah Academy 
Tipprah Academy High School was established in 1992 and it is managed by the Pvt. Unaided. It is located in Rural area. It is located in HEZAMARA block of WEST TRIPURA district of Tripura. The school consists of Grades from 1 to 12. 

Barkathal Higher Secondary School 

BARKATHAL H.S. SCHOOL was established in 1948 and it is managed by the Department of Education. It is located in Rural area. It is located in Hezamara block of West Tripura district of Tripura. The school consists of Grades from 1 to 12. The school is Co-educational and it doesn't have an attached pre-primary section. The school is Not Applicable in nature and is not using school building as a shift-school. Bengali is the medium of instructions in this school.

Nearby villages
The villages nearby includes Dugrai, Tokmakari, Kutna, Twibrub and many more. and Khwichang is established in 1988. Khwichang Church will be celebrating silver Jubili on 2013. Khwichang Baptist Church first Decan is Lt. Samarendra Debbarma

See also
 Tripuri people
 TTAADC
 Khumulwng, the headquarters of TTAADC
Kokborok

References

Cities and towns in West Tripura district